Dieter Kühn (born 4 July 1956 in Leipzig, Bezirk Leipzig) is a former Association football player from East Germany, who won the silver medal with the East Germany national team at the 1980 Summer Olympics in Moscow, Soviet Union. He obtained a total of thirteen caps for his native country, scoring five goals.

References
 Profile

External links
 Profile at Lok-Leipzig-DB.com
 

1956 births
Living people
Footballers from Leipzig
People from Bezirk Leipzig
German footballers
East German footballers
Association football forwards
DDR-Oberliga players
FC Sachsen Leipzig players
1. FC Lokomotive Leipzig players
East Germany international footballers
Olympic footballers of East Germany
Footballers at the 1980 Summer Olympics
Olympic silver medalists for East Germany
Olympic medalists in football
Medalists at the 1980 Summer Olympics
Recipients of the Patriotic Order of Merit in bronze